Dusponera is a genus of moths of the family Erebidae. The genus was erected by Paul Dognin in 1914.

Species
Dusponera fannia Schaus, 1916 French Guiana
Dusponera semifalcata Dognin, 1914 Ecuador

References

Herminiinae